The Hezilo chandelier is an 11th-century Romanesque wheel chandelier. It is part of the treasures of the Hildesheim Cathedral in Hildesheim, Germany, which has been a UNESCO World Cultural Heritage site since 1985. The chandelier was most likely commissioned by Bishop Hezilo of Hildesheim, who rebuilt the cathedral after a fire. He probably also influenced the program of imagery and inscriptions. It is the largest of four extant wheel chandeliers of the period; the others surviving examples are the Azelin chandelier (also in Hildesheim), the Barbarossa chandelier in the Aachen Cathedral, and the Hartwig chandelier in the Abbey of Comburg.

During the restoration of the cathedral (from 2010 to 2014), the chandelier was installed in St. Godehard, a basilica since 1963 and the temporary bishop's seat. After the restoration of the cathedral, reopened on 15 August 2014, it was returned to its original location in the cathedral's nave.

Description 

The hoop is made of gilt copper and bears Latin inscriptions on the upper and lower edges. Between the inscriptions are three horizontal bands, with the middle band bulging outwards, which are richly decorated with openwork foliage. There are square merlons on top of the hoop holding seventy-two candles.

Twelve towers and twelve gate-houses alternate along the outside of the hoop. The layout of the towers is a Greek cross with four apses (alternately rounded with domed roofs and square with pitched roofs) and a doorway. The upper parts of the towers have a narrower form, extending above the candles on the hoop and topped with large balls. Small statues or lamps probably originally stood inside these towers.

The gatehouses are flat, no higher than the hoop and are closed at the rear - where the ropes which hold up the chandelier are anchored. Each gate is flanked by two small but richly decorated round turrets and is crowned with battlements and the name of an apostle. It is likely that there were once images of these apostles in the doorways.

In the center, a large lamp is hung from a rope. It hung above the altar in the crossing from the reopening of the cathedral in 1960 to 2010, when cathedral restoration work began.

History 

Bernward, Bishop of Hildesheim, gifted the first large wheel chandelier to the Hildesheim Cathedral built by Bishop Altfrid, and later also gave one to the adjacent church of St. Michael. After Altfrid's cathedral burned down in 1046, Bishop Hezilo had it rebuilt with alterations, rejecting the plan of his predecessor Azelin to build a new cathedral, and in the nave he hung a "crown chandelier of shimmering gold", which is now known by his name as the Hezilo chandelier. It is not clear what influence the earlier chandelier of Bernward had on the design of this replacement.

Symbolism 

The model for a chandelier as the symbol of the New Jerusalem was the great wheel chandelier in the Church of the Holy Sepulchre above Golgotha; the Azelin chandelier was designed to have the same symbolism. Elements of Islamic art in the ornamentation of the chandelier support the identification with Jerusalem.

The Hezilo chandelier was at the liturgical center of the cathedral until the nineteenth century, with services held under its crown of light. Its location marked the beginning and end of the great processions of the cathedral chapter on Sundays and holidays. The chandelier served as a symbol of righteousness. Violations of the sovereignty of the diocese were solemnly resolved beneath it.

Restoration 

Restoration work was carried out in the 16th century and again at the beginning of the 19th and 20th centuries,  During the Second World War, the Hezilo chandelier was dismantled and removed from the cathedral — which was virtually destroyed by Allied bombing in March 1945. After the cathedral was rebuilt during the 1950s, the 900-year-old chandelier was placed in the crossing. It underwent extensive conservation work from 2002 until 2007. In 2010, when restoration work on the cathedral began, it was moved to St. Godehard, a Romanesque church in Hildesheim and the temporary seat of the bishop.

Inscription 

Due to early modern restorations, the verse inscription has been significantly altered. The donor's name, "Hezilo" was written in a later script. The oldest version is in a manuscript from around 1500:

Bibliography 
 Willmuth Arenhövel. Der Hezilo-Radleuchter im Dom zu Hildesheim: Beiträge zur Hildesheimer Kunst des 11. Jahrhunderts unter besonderer Berücksichtigung der Ornamentik. Mann, Berlin 1975, .
 Norbert Bergmann. "Der Hezilo-Leuchter – Eine Systemanalyse und ihre Folgen," in Ursula Schädler-Saub (ed.), Weltkulturerbe Deutschland. Präventative Konservierung und Erhaltungsperspektiven, internationale Fachtagung des Deutschen Nationalkomitees von ICOMOS. Hildesheim, 23.–25. November 2006. Regensburg 2008
 Adolf Bertram. Geschichte des Bisthums Hildesheim, Vol. I, Hildesheim 1899, pp. 116f & 120f.
 Bernhard Gallistl. "Bedeutung und Gebrauch der großen Lichterkrone im Hildesheimer Dom" in Concilium medii aevi 12, 2009, pp. 43–88, online:  (PDF; 2,9 MB). Retrieved 18 January 2012
 Ulrich Knapp, Karl Bernhard Kruse. Der Hezilo-Leuchter im Hildesheimer Dom. Schnell und Steiner, Regensburg 2013, 
 Ch. Wulf (ed.). Die Inschriften der Stadt Hildesheim. Ges. und bearb. von Ch. Wulf. Wiesbaden 2003, (Die deutschen Inschriften 58). vol 2. pp. 213–216

References

External links 

 The Hezilo-candlesticks in: Restoration of the World Cultural Heritage Hildesheim Cathedral

Romanesque art
Individual lamps
Hildesheim Cathedral
Medieval European metalwork objects